Spalding bus station is a bus station in Spalding, Lincolnshire. It is owned and operated by South Holland District Council.

History 
Plans for the bus station were being discussed in the 1940s. The bus station opened in 1956.

On 3 October 2022, a £100,000 refurbishment of the bus station began. The work saw the lanes resurfaced, curbing replaced, and shelters cleaned.

References 

Spalding, Lincolnshire
Bus stations in England
Transport in Lincolnshire